Hildemaro Lista (born 26 January 1905, date of death unknown) was a Uruguayan fencer. He competed in the team sabre event at the 1936 Summer Olympics.

References

External links
 

1905 births
Year of death missing
People from Durazno
Uruguayan male sabre fencers
Olympic fencers of Uruguay
Fencers at the 1936 Summer Olympics